Hylaeus may refer to:
Hylaeus and Rhoecus, two centaurs in Greek mythology
Hylaeus (bee), a genus of bees